This is a list of public art in Coventry, in the West Midlands, England. This list applies only to works of public art accessible in an outdoor public space. For example, this does not include artwork visible inside a museum.

Central Coventry

Coventry Cathedral

Herbert Art Gallery and Museum

Millennium Place

Coventry Council House

Greyfriars Green

Broadgate and Hertford Street

Bull Yard

Coventry University

Belgrade Theatre

Other city centre areas

Coventry Ring Road

Coventry Canal

Foleshill

References

Coventry
Public art